Iskut Canyon Cone, also known as Iskut River Cone, is a cinder cone of the Iskut-Unuk River Cones group in northwestern British Columbia, Canada, located on the steep southern flank of the Iskut valley near its junction with Forrest Kerr Creek. It last erupted during the Holocene epoch.

See also
List of volcanoes in Canada
List of Northern Cordilleran volcanoes
Volcanism of Canada
Volcanism of Western Canada

References

Cinder cones of British Columbia
Northern Cordilleran Volcanic Province
Polygenetic volcanoes
Boundary Ranges